Charles A. Baumhauer (August 16, 1889 – June 22, 1982) was a Mobile, Alabama-area community leader and politician who served several terms on the Mobile City Commission as well as several terms as mayor of Mobile. All of his terms as mayor were when the title was co-extensive with the presidency of the City Commission. He was defeated for re-election in 1953 by Joseph N. Langan.

References

External links
World Statesmen list of Mayors of Mobile

1889 births
1982 deaths
Mayors of Mobile, Alabama
20th-century American politicians